Water polo at the 2017 Islamic Solidarity Games was held from 13 to 17 May 2017 at the Water Polo Arena in Baku.

Medalists

Results

References 
Pool standings

External links 
Official website

2017 Islamic Solidarity Games
2017
Islamic Solidarity Games
2017